Renato Josué Román Arce (born April 10, 1990 in Lagos de Moreno, Jalisco) is a former Mexican professional footballer who played for Mineros de Zacatecas of Ascenso MX.

References

External links
 Renato Josué Román Arce at Ascenso MX 
 
 

Living people
1990 births
Ascenso MX players
Deportivo Toluca F.C. players
Cruz Azul footballers
Venados F.C. players
Tlaxcala F.C. players
Tampico Madero F.C. footballers
Alebrijes de Oaxaca players
Mineros de Zacatecas players
People from Lagos de Moreno, Jalisco
Association football midfielders
Mexican footballers